Williams School may refer to any of a number of schools.

in the United States

Williams School (Connecticut), New London, Connecticut, a coeducational independent high school located on the campus of Connecticut College.
Williams Grove School, Angier, North Carolina
Williams School (Cameron, Oklahoma)
Roger Williams Public School No. 10, Scranton, Pennsylvania
Williams Creek School (Gillespie County, Texas), Stonewall, Texas
Peabody Building of the Peabody-Williams School, Petersburg, Virginia
The Williams School (Norfolk VA)